American Beauty is a 1999 American drama film directed by Sam Mendes and written by Alan Ball. The film stars Kevin Spacey as Lester Burnham, a middle-aged office worker who has a midlife crisis when he becomes infatuated with his teenage daughter's best friend. Released in North America on September 15, 1999, American Beauty was positively received by critics and audiences alike; it was the best-reviewed American film of the year and grossed over $350 million worldwide. Reviewers praised all aspects of the production, with particular emphasis on Mendes, Spacey and Ball; criticism tended to focus on the familiarity of the characters and setting. At the 1999 Academy Awards, the film won Best Picture, Best Director, Best Actor (for Spacey), Best Original Screenplay and Best Cinematography (for Conrad Hall). The film was nominated for and won numerous other awards and honors, mainly for the direction, writing, and acting.

DreamWorks launched a major campaign to promote the film five weeks before the ballots for the Academy Awards were due. Its campaign combined traditional advertising and publicity with more focused strategies to reach 5,600 Academy voters.  Although direct mail campaigning was prohibited, DreamWorks reached voters by promoting the film in "casual, comfortable settings" in voters' communities.  The studio's candidate for the Academy Award for Best Picture the previous year, Saving Private Ryan, lost to Shakespeare in Love, so the studio took a new approach by hiring outsiders to provide input for the campaign. Nancy Willen encouraged DreamWorks to produce a special about the making of American Beauty, to set up displays of the film in the communities' bookstores, and to arrange a question-and-answer session with Mendes for the British Academy of Film and Television Arts. Dale Olson, who led the film's campaign, advised the studio to not limit its marketing to major newspapers, but to also advertise in free publications that circulated in Beverly Hills, home to many voters. Olson arranged to screen American Beauty to about 1,000 members of the Actors Fund of America, as many participating actors were also voters.

American Beautys closest contender for Best Picture was seen as The Cider House Rules from Miramax. Both studios mounted aggressive campaigns; in the weeks leading up the ceremony, DreamWorks bought 38% more advertising space in Variety than Miramax. In 2000, the Publicists Guild of America recognized DreamWorks for the best film publicity campaign. In September 2008, Empire named American Beauty the 96th "Greatest Movie of All Time" after a poll of 10,000 readers, 150 filmmakers and 50 film critics. The film's award success was seen as vindication for DreamWorks, a studio which had only formed six years previously—to industry skepticism.

Selected awards and nominations

 AFI's 100 Years... 100 Movie Quotes
 "Sometimes there's so much beauty in the world I feel like I can't take it, like my heart's going to cave in." – Nominated.

References

External links
 

Lists of accolades by film